The 2017 Georgia State Panthers football team represented Georgia State University (GSU) in the 2017 NCAA Division I FBS football season. The Panthers were led by first-year head coach Shawn Elliott. The season marked the first in which they played in the newly acquired Georgia State Stadium, a renovated Turner Field with artificial turf and a 22,000 person capacity. The season was the Panthers' fifth in the Sun Belt Conference and eighth since starting football. The Panthers finished the season 7–5, 5–3 in Sun Belt play to finish in fourth place. They received an invite to the Cure Bowl, where Georgia State defeated Western Kentucky for the Panthers' first bowl win in program history.

Previous season
In 2016, the Panthers regressed from their previous season, managing a 3–9 season. By their penultimate game, the university fired previous head coach Trent Miles. At the same time, the Panthers ended their tenure at the Georgia Dome, with a new on-campus stadium, Georgia State Stadium, being built out of the former Turner Field.

Offseason

2017 NFL Draft

Panthers picked in the 2017 NFL Draft:

Recruits
As of December 21, 2016, the Panthers have a total of 20 recruits committed. Eight are three-star recruits.

Coaching and support staff

Schedule
Georgia State announced its 2017 football schedule on March 1, 2017. The 2017 schedule consisted of 6 home and away games in the regular season. The Panthers hosted Sun Belt foes Troy, South Alabama, Appalachian State, and Idaho, and traveled to Coastal Carolina, ULM, Georgia Southern, and Texas State. Georgia State did not play two Sun Belt teams this season, Louisiana and New Mexico State. The team played three non–conference games, one home game against Tennessee State from the Ohio Valley Conference (OVC), and two road games against Penn State from the Big Ten and Charlotte from Conference USA.

The scheduled home game against Memphis was canceled when the AAC bought out the contract between the schools for $1.1 million to reschedule a conference game between Memphis and UCF that was canceled during the second week of the season due to Hurricane Irma.

Schedule source:

Game summaries

Tennessee State

 First game at Georgia State Stadium.

at Penn State

at Charlotte

at Coastal Carolina

at Louisiana–Monroe

Troy

South Alabama

at Georgia Southern

at Texas State

Appalachian State

Idaho

 This was the Vandals' final game as an FBS member for the foreseeable future. Idaho football will downgrade to FCS, joining the school's other sports in the Big Sky Conference for 2018 and beyond.

vs Western Kentucky–Cure Bowl

Roster

References

Georgia State
Georgia State Panthers football seasons
Cure Bowl champion seasons
Georgia State Panthers football